Hurricane Hollow is a valley in Christian and Taney counties in the U.S. state of Missouri.

Hurricane Hollow was named for a hurricane which struck the area in the 1890s.

References

Valleys of Christian County, Missouri
Valleys of Taney County, Missouri
Valleys of Missouri